Glyphipterix mikadonis is a species of sedge moth in the genus Glyphipterix which is endemic to Japan.

The forewings are dark fuscous and the hindwings are fuscous. Adults have been recorded from the end of May to the beginning of June.

References

External links

Moths described in 2006
Endemic fauna of Japan
Glyphipterigidae
Moths of Japan